Shel Brodsgaard (born May 29, 1970) is a Canadian former professional goalkeeper.

Early life
Brodsgaard began playing soccer with the Gorge Youth Soccer Association and represented British Columbia at U16 and U18 Provincial All-Star levels.

Career
He signed his first professional contract at age 15, with the Edmonton Brick Men of the Canadian Soccer League. He later played with the Victoria Vistas, Nova Scotia Clippers, and North York Rockets. He also played with the Tacoma Stars of the Major Indoor Soccer League. He also played for the Winnipeg Fury and Danish side Hvidovre IF. Prior to joining the Rockets, he had a trial with Danish club Boldklubben 1909.

International career
He made one appearance for the Canadian national team.
He was a member of the 1992 Canadian Olympic Qualifying team, but did not make an appearance. He won a gold medal at the 1989 Jeux de la Francophonie.

Coaching
He has served as the Goalkeeper Coach for the Canada women's national soccer team as well as the women's youth teams from 2000 to 2006. He became Canada's National Goalkeeping Coach in 2004.

As an assistant coach, with the Simon Fraser University women's team, he won the 2001 NAIA championship.

In 2019, he had the opportunity to be a guest coach and learn from the Olympique Lyonnais women's team coaches.

He currently serves as the Technical Director for the Upper Island Riptide Soccer Association.

Personal
He graduated from the University of Victoria. He is the author of two books: Guarding the Goal and Goals and Dreams: A Celebration of Canadian Women's Soccer.

References 

1970 births
Living people
Canadian soccer players
Soccer players from Victoria, British Columbia
Victoria Vistas players
Nova Scotia Clippers players
North York Rockets players
Canadian Soccer League (1987–1992) players
Association football goalkeepers